Dmitrii (or Dmitry) Valerevich Treschev (Дмитрий Валерьевич Трещёв, born 25 October 1964 im Olenegorsk, Murmansk Oblast)  is a Russian mathematician and mathematical physicist, specializing in dynamical systems of classical mechanics.

Education and career
Treschev completed his secondary study in 1981 with degree from the Специализированный учебно-научный центр (СУНЦ) МГУ имени А.Н. Колмогорова (Specialized Educational and Scientific Center, МГУ, Physics and Mathematics Boarding School No. 18 named after A. N. Kolmogorov). Treschev completed his undergraduate study in 1986 with degree from the Faculty of Mechanics and Mathematics, Moscow State University. There in 1988 he received his Candidate of Sciences degree (PhD) with thesis Геометрические методы исследования периодических траекторий динамических систем (Geometric methods of investigation of periodic trajectories of dynamical systems) under the supervision of Valerii Vasilievich Kozlov. In 1992 Treschev received his Russian Doctor of Sciences degree (habilitation) with thesis Качественные методы исследования гамильтоновых систем, близких к интегрируемым (Qualitative methods for studying Hamiltonian systems close to integrable).

At the secondary school СУНЦ, Treschev taught as a professor in the Department of Mathematics from 1986 until his resignation. At Moscow State University, he is since 1993 a leading researcher, since 1998 a professor, and since 2006 head of the Department of Theoretical Mechanics. At the Steklov Institute he became in 2005 a chief researcher and the deputy director for research and is since 2017 the director for research. He is the author or coauthor of over 70 scientific publications. Together with V. V. Kozlov, he supervises the seminar Избранные задачи классической динамики (Selected problems of classical dynamics).

Treschev's research deals with integrability and non-integrability, dynamical stability, KAM theory, separatrix splitting, averaging in slow-fast systems, chaos in Hamiltonian dynamics, Arnold diffusion, statistical mechanics, and ergodic theory. He has served on the editorial boards of the journals Nonlinearity (1st published in 1988),  Chaos, Mathematical Notes, and Regular and Chaotic Dynamics (first published in 2007).

In 1995 Treschev was a Laureate of the State Prize of the Russian Federation for young scientists. In 2007 he was awarded the Lyapunov Prize. He was elected in 2003 a corresponding member and in 2016 a full member of the Russian Academy of Sciences. In 2002 he was an invited speaker with talk Continuous averaging in dynamical systems at the International Congress of Mathematicians in Beijing.

Selected publications

Articles

Books

References

External links
mathnet.ru

1964 births
Living people
Moscow State University alumni
Academic staff of Moscow State University
Academic staff of the Steklov Institute of Mathematics
20th-century Russian mathematicians
21st-century Russian mathematicians
Dynamical systems theorists
Mathematical physicists